"Es Por Ti" (English: Because of You) is a song written and performed by Colombian singer-songwriter Juanes. It's the second radio single from his sophomore studio album Un Día Normal (2002). It was released on 23 September 2002 (see 2002 in music).

The single earned him two Latin Grammy Awards for Song of the Year and Record of the Year. The song is a slow-rock pop ballad that revolves around love towards a romantic partner.

Chart performance

Weekly charts

Year-end charts

Certifications

References 

2002 singles
2002 songs
Juanes songs
Number-one singles in Spain
Song recordings produced by Gustavo Santaolalla
Songs written by Juanes
Spanish-language songs
Universal Music Latino singles
2000s ballads
Rock ballads
Latin Grammy Award for Record of the Year
Latin Grammy Award for Song of the Year